Malibu Hindu Temple, a temple of the Hindu god Venkateswara, built in 1981, is located in the city of Calabasas near Malibu, California, in the Santa Monica Mountains. It is owned and operated by the Hindu Temple Society of Southern California. Built in the traditional South Indian style, it is frequented by followers of Hinduism in Southern California. It is one of the largest Hindu temples in the Western hemisphere.

The priests are situated and live on the grounds of the temple. The temple has many gatherings for ceremonies and provides numerous spaces for meditation and picnicking. It has a full stage for special cultural and Hindu programs.

Management
The founding president of the Temple was Vasan Srinivasan, a civil engineer living in the Los Angeles area. Srinivasan was instrumental in raising funds from local families, overseeing construction and bringing the priests from India.  During the early 1990s, Dr. Parameswar Mahadevan, an atomic physicist and one of the individuals involved in the Temple’s founding, served as president. Later, and until his death in July 2017, Indian American tax consultant Nadadur Vardhan served as the temple's president. The temple is generally managed by Hindu Temple society of Southern California.

Temple complex
The Hindu temple has two complexes – the upper complex with Lord Venkateswara as the presiding deity and the lower complex with Lord Shiva as the presiding deity. In addition to the presiding deity, both complexes have shrines for other deities.

In popular culture
In 1997, the temple was used in a small scene in the movie Beverly Hills Ninja starring Chris Farley, and in 1998 in a song in the Tamil film Jeans. It is also shown briefly during Season 8 Episode 12 of the TV sitcom "The Big Bang Theory." In January 2006, the pop-star singer Britney Spears had her 4-month-old son blessed in a large ceremony by the Hindu priests of this temple. The event had worldwide coverage in the media.

References

External links

 Official website
 Archived official site at the Wayback Machine
 Malibu Temple pictures
 Home&Abroad – Visitor information and review

Hindu temples in California
Santa Monica Mountains
Religious buildings and structures in Los Angeles County, California
Calabasas, California
Indian-American culture in California
Buildings and structures in Los Angeles County, California
1981 establishments in California